South Bank St Peters F.C. was an English association football club which participated in the FA Cup.

References

Defunct football clubs in England
Defunct football clubs in North Yorkshire